The 2001 Grand American Road Racing Championship was the second season of the Rolex Sports Car Series run by the Grand American Road Racing Association.  The season involved five classes: Sports Racing Prototype I and II (SRP-I and SRP-II), Grand Touring Sport (GTS), Grand Touring (GT), and American GT (AGT). 10 races were run from February 3, 2001 to November 3, 2001, with Watkins Glen International gaining a date in August.

Schedule
Some events featured two races of different length, with a break-up of the five competing classes.

Results 
Overall winners in bold.

† - Two separate individual races were held.

References

External links
 The official website of Grand-Am
 World Sports Racing Prototypes - Rolex Sports Car Series 2001 results

Rolex Sports Car Series
Rolex Sports Car Series